Michael Vincent Budenholzer (born August 6, 1969) is an American professional basketball coach who is the head coach of the Milwaukee Bucks of the National Basketball Association (NBA). Before joining the Bucks, he spent five seasons as head coach of the Atlanta Hawks and 19 seasons with the San Antonio Spurs, serving as an alternate video coordinator for the first two seasons and then as an assistant coach behind head coach Gregg Popovich. In 2021, Budenholzer coached the Bucks to their first NBA championship since 1971.

As a protégé of Gregg Popovich, Budenholzer is, similar to his mentor, commonly referred to by other coaches, players and media as "Bud" or "Coach Bud".

Playing career
A native of Holbrook, Arizona, Budenholzer attended Pomona College, where he was a four-year letterman in basketball and golf and was named the Outstanding Senior Athlete in 1993. He graduated with a bachelor's degree in philosophy, politics, and economics. On September 19, 2015, Budenholzer was inducted into the Pomona-Pitzer Hall of Fame.

Coaching career
After college, he spent the 1993–94 season in Denmark, playing professionally for Vejle Basketball Klub, where he averaged a team-high 27.5 points per game while also serving as head coach for two teams of the club's youth system. Previously, he had a "cup of coffee" playing for Pentland in the Scottish League.

San Antonio Spurs 

At the start of the 1994–95 season, Budenholzer was hired by the San Antonio Spurs of the National Basketball Association (NBA) as a video coordinator. He held that position for two years before being named an assistant coach under head coach Gregg Popovich at the beginning of the 1996–97 season. Budenholzer was part of a staff that won four NBA championships while with the Spurs.

Atlanta Hawks 
Budenholzer left San Antonio at the end of the 2013 NBA Playoffs to begin his new career as the head coach of the Atlanta Hawks. In his first season as head coach, the Hawks would qualify for the Eastern Conference playoffs as the 8th seed in the 2014 NBA Playoffs but would lose to the first-seeded Indiana Pacers in the first round.

Budenholzer was named the December 2014 Eastern Conference Coach of the Month after leading the Hawks to a 14–2 record in the month. He was named the head coach of the Eastern Conference team at the 2015 NBA All-Star Game by virtue of Atlanta being in first place in the conference by the break. Budenholzer was named the January 2015 Eastern Conference Coach of the Month award after leading the Hawks to the first 17–0 record in a month in NBA history. He went on to lead the Hawks to a franchise record 60 wins, as well as their deepest playoff run in 48 years. On April 21, he was named the recipient of the Red Auerbach Trophy as the 2014–15 NBA Coach of the Year.

On June 30, 2015, Budenholzer was promoted to president of basketball operations in addition to his duties as head coach. While Wes Wilcox was promoted to general manager, Budenholzer had the final say in all basketball matters.

On August 1, 2015, Budenholzer served as Team Africa's assistant coach at the 2015 NBA Africa exhibition game.

On April 25, 2018, Budenholzer and the Hawks agreed to part ways, having been removed as president of basketball operations for the Hawks on May 5, 2017.

Milwaukee Bucks 
On May 17, 2018, the Milwaukee Bucks announced Budenholzer as their head coach. The Bucks found success in his first season, posting a 60–22 record. In January, Budenholzer was selected as the coach of the East team in the 2019 NBA All-Star Game. At the end of the season, he won the NBA Coach of the Year for the second time in his career and also won the National Basketball Coaches Association's Coach of the Year Award.

On July 20, 2021, Budenholzer led the Milwaukee Bucks to an NBA championship, defeating the Phoenix Suns in six games, as the Bucks became the fifth team in NBA history to win the title after losing each of the first two games.

Head coaching record

|-
| style="text-align:left;"|Atlanta
| style="text-align:left;"|
| 82||38||44|||| style="text-align:center;"|4th in Southeast||7||3||4||
| style="text-align:center;"|Lost in First Round
|-
| style="text-align:left;"|Atlanta
| style="text-align:left;"|
| 82||60||22|||| style="text-align:center;"|1st in Southeast||16||8||8||
| style="text-align:center;"|Lost in Conference Finals
|-
| style="text-align:left;"|Atlanta
| style="text-align:left;"|
| 82||48||34|||| style="text-align:center;"|2nd in Southeast||10||4||6||
| style="text-align:center;"|Lost in Conference Semifinals
|-
| style="text-align:left;"|Atlanta
| style="text-align:left;"|
| 82||43||39|||| style="text-align:center;"|2nd in Southeast||6||2||4||
| style="text-align:center;"|Lost in First Round
|-
| style="text-align:left;"|Atlanta
| style="text-align:left;"|
| 82||24||58|||| style="text-align:center;"|5th in Southeast||—||—||—||—
| style="text-align:center;"|Missed playoffs
|-
| style="text-align:left;"|Milwaukee
| style="text-align:left;"|
| 82||60||22|||| style="text-align:center;"|1st in Central||15||10||5||
| style="text-align:center;"|Lost in Conference Finals
|-
| style="text-align:left;"|Milwaukee
| style="text-align:left;"|
| 73||56||17|||| style="text-align:center;"|1st in Central||10||5||5||
| style="text-align:center;"|Lost in Conference Semifinals
|- style="background:#FDE910;"
| style="text-align:left;"|Milwaukee
| style="text-align:left;"|
| 72||46||26|||| style="text-align:center;"|1st in Central||23||16||7||
| data-sort-value="1" style="text-align:center;"|Won NBA Championship
|- 
| style="text-align:left;"|Milwaukee
| style="text-align:left;"|
| 82||51||31|||| style="text-align:center;"|1st in Central||12||7||5||
| data-sort-value="1" style="text-align:center;"|Lost in Conference Semifinals
|- class="sortbottom"
| style="text-align:center;" colspan="2"|Career
| 719||426||293|||| ||99||55||44||||

Personal life
Budenholzer is the youngest of seven children born to Vince and Libby Budenholzer. He is of German descent. His father was also a basketball coach and spent 25 years coaching high school and college teams in Arizona before retiring in 1997. Budenholzer has four children: William Vincent, Savoia Elizabeth, Hanna Louise, and John Bent.

References

External links

 Mike Budenholzer Info Page at NBA.com

1969 births
Living people
American expatriate basketball people in Denmark
American men's basketball players
American people of German descent
Atlanta Hawks head coaches
Basketball coaches from Arizona
Basketball players from Arizona
Milwaukee Bucks head coaches
National Basketball Association championship-winning head coaches
People from Holbrook, Arizona
Pomona College alumni
Pomona-Pitzer Sagehens men's basketball players
San Antonio Spurs assistant coaches